Primula jeffreyi, synonym Dodecatheon jeffreyi, is a species of flowering plant in the primrose family known by the common names Sierra shooting star, Jeffrey's shooting star, and tall mountain shooting star. This wildflower is native to western North America from California to Alaska to Montana, where it grows in mountain meadows and streambanks.  This is a thick-rooted perennial with long, slightly wrinkled leaves around the base. It erects slim, tall, hairy stems which are dark in color and are topped with inflorescences of 3 to 18 showy flowers. Each flower nods, with its pointed center aimed at the ground when fresh, and becomes more erect with age. It has four or five reflexed sepals in shades of pink, lavender, or white which lie back against the body of the flower. Each sepal base has a blotch of bright yellow. From the corolla mouth protrude large dark  anthers surrounding a threadlike stigma. The flowers of this species were considered good luck by the Nlaka'pamux people, who used them as amulets and love charms. The specific epithet jeffreyi is in honor of John Jeffrey.

References

External links

Jepson Manual Treatment
USDA Plants Profile
Ethnobotany
Photo gallery

jeffreyi
Flora of California
Flora of Canada
Flora of Alaska
Flora of Oregon
Flora of Montana
Flora of Idaho
Flora of Washington (state)
Flora of the Sierra Nevada (United States)
Plants described in 1867
Flora without expected TNC conservation status